Lawrence Ledwith McClure (October 8, 1884 – September 1, 1949) was a Major League Baseball player. He played in one game on July 26, 1910, for the New York Highlanders.  McClure was a relatively small person, standing at 5 feet, 6 inches and weighing 130 pounds.

McClure attended West Virginia University, where he played college baseball for the Mountaineers in 1910.  McClure also attended Amherst College.

References

External links
Career statistics and biography at Baseball Reference, Fangraphs or Baseball Almanac

New York Yankees players
Baseball players from West Virginia
Amherst Mammoths baseball players
West Virginia Mountaineers baseball players
1884 births
1949 deaths
People from Wayne County, West Virginia